Dominique Franks (born October 8, 1987) is an American football coach and former cornerback who is the defensive backs coach for the New Jersey Generals of the United States Football League (USFL). He was drafted by the Atlanta Falcons in the fifth round of the 2010 NFL Draft. Franks played college football at Oklahoma.

Professional career

Pre-draft
Franks was considered one of the top cornerback prospects for the 2010 NFL Draft. Franks announced on January 5, 2010 that he would forgo his senior season and enter the 2010 NFL Draft.

Atlanta Falcons
Franks was selected by the Atlanta Falcons in the fifth round (135th pick overall) of the 2010 NFL Draft.

Baltimore Ravens
Franks signed with the Baltimore Ravens on June 19, 2014. He was released on August 30, 2014 with the final round of cuts during the preseason. He re-signed with the team on October 7, 2014. He was released on November 4, 2014, after the signing of Danny Gorrer.

Hudson Valley Fort
Franks signed with the Hudson Valley Fort of the Fall Experimental Football League (FXFL) in 2015.

Coaching career

New Jersey Generals 
On March 17, 2022, it was announced that Franks was hired as the defensive backs coach of the New Jersey Generals of the United States Football League.

References

External links
 Atlanta Falcons bio
 Oklahoma Sooners bio

1987 births
Living people
Sportspeople from Tulsa, Oklahoma
Players of American football from Oklahoma
American football cornerbacks
Oklahoma Sooners football players
Atlanta Falcons players
Baltimore Ravens players
Hudson Valley Fort players
New Jersey Generals (2022) coaches